Md. Shahab Uddin (born 31 December 1954) is a Bangladesh Awami League politician, He is the Minister of Environment, Forest and Climate Change in the Bangladesh Government and the incumbent member of parliament from Moulvibazar-1.

Career
Uddin was elected to the parliament on 5 January 2014 from Moulvibazar-1 as a Bangladesh Awami League candidate. He is also the whip of the parliament.

References

Living people
1954 births
People from Moulvibazar District
Awami League politicians
10th Jatiya Sangsad members
11th Jatiya Sangsad members
Environment, Forest and Climate Change ministers of Bangladesh